Kathleen Russell (17 November 1912 – 26 November 1992) was a South African freestyle swimmer who competed in the 1928 Summer Olympics.

In 1928 she was a member of the South African relay team which won the bronze medal in the 4×100 m freestyle relay event. She also competed in the 400 metre freestyle competition, but was eliminated in the semi-finals.

At the 1934 Empire Games she won the silver medal with the South African team in the 4×100 yards freestyle relay contest.

External links
Kathleen Russell's profile at Sports Reference.com

1912 births
1992 deaths
South African female swimmers
South African female freestyle swimmers
Olympic swimmers of South Africa
Swimmers at the 1928 Summer Olympics
Olympic bronze medalists for South Africa
Swimmers at the 1934 British Empire Games
Commonwealth Games silver medallists for South Africa
Olympic bronze medalists in swimming
Medalists at the 1928 Summer Olympics
Commonwealth Games medallists in swimming
Medallists at the 1934 British Empire Games